Kreuzbach  may refer to:

Kreuzbach (Strudelbach), a river of Baden-Württemberg, Germany, tributary of the Strudelbach
Kreuzbach (Erlenbach), a river of North Rhine-Westphalia, Germany, tributary of the Erlenbach